The 1988 Paris–Roubaix was the 86th edition of the Paris–Roubaix cycle race and was held on 10 April 1988. The race started in Compiègne and finished in Roubaix. The race was won by Dirk Demol of the AD Renting team.

General classification

References

Paris–Roubaix
1988 in road cycling
1988 in French sport